Josep Sunyol i Garriga (21 July 1898, Barcelona – 6 August 1936, Sierra de Guadarrama) was a Catalan lawyer, journalist and politician from Spain, and president of FC Barcelona, he advocated for the independence of Catalonia from Spain.

Sunyol came from both a wealthy family and a long line of Catalan political militants. He was a member of Acció Catalana, a 
left-wing group and Esquerra Republicana de Catalunya.

In 1928 he became a director of FC Barcelona and in 1930 he founded the left-wing newspaper La Rambla, which opposed the Primo de Rivera regime. In 1931 he was elected to the Cortes as an ERC deputy. He was subsequently re-elected in 1933 and 1936. 

He served as president of both the Reial Automòbil Club de Catalunya and the Federació Catalana de Futbol. In 1935 he was elected president of FC Barcelona. 

On 6 August 1936, during the early days of the Spanish Civil War, Sunyol was arrested by Francoist troops in the Sierra de Guadarrama and was then murdered by one of Franco's soldiers. His body was only exhumed in the 1990s after Els Amics de Josep Sunyol (The Friends of Josep Sunyol) campaigned for FC Barcelona to recognize the 60th anniversary of his death in 1996. A memorial stone to Sunyol was placed in a park nearby the location he was killed, and Sunyol is now described as 'the Martyr President' by FC Barcelona.

References

1898 births
1936 deaths
Politicians from Barcelona
Republican Left of Catalonia politicians
Members of the Congress of Deputies of the Second Spanish Republic
Lawyers from Barcelona
FC Barcelona presidents
Spanish people of the Spanish Civil War (Republican faction)